Siphoneugena densiflora is a species of plant in the family Myrtaceae. It is endemic to Brazil. Typically found as a shrub up to 3 metres tall, and more rarely as a tree up to between 12 and 13 metres tall, this plant produces edible purplish-black fruit that are less than 10mm in diameter.

References

Endemic flora of Brazil
densiflora
Vulnerable plants
Taxonomy articles created by Polbot
Taxobox binomials not recognized by IUCN